The 45th Japan National University Rugby Championship (2008/2009). Eventually won by Waseda beating Teikyo 20 - 10.

Qualifying Teams
Kanto League A (Taiko)
 Teikyo University, Waseda, Nippon Sport Science University, Keio University, University of Tsukuba

Kanto League B
 Tokai University, Hosei University, Kanto Gakuin University, Nihon University, Ryutsu Keizai University

Kansai League
 Kwansei Gakuin, Doshisha University, Tenri, Ritsumeikan, Setsunan University

Kyushu League
 Fukuoka

Knockout stage

Final

Universities Competing
 Tokai University
 Nihon University
 Doshisha University
 Ryutsu Keizai University
 Kanto Gakuin University
 Setsunan University
 Nippon Sport Science University
 Teikyo University
 Doshisha University
 Hosei University
 Kanto Gakuin University
 Meiji University
 University of Tsukuba
 Waseda University Rugby Football Club

External links
 The 45th Japan University Rugby Championship - JRFU Official Page (Japanese)
 The 45th Japan University Rugby Championship Final - JRFU Official Page (Japanese)
 Rugby union in Japan

All-Japan University Rugby Championship
Univ